Veronique Hronek (born 23 September 1991) is a German alpine ski racer.

She competed at the 2015 World Championships in Beaver Creek, USA, in the Super-G. She is the older sister of freestyle skier Tim Hronek.

References

1991 births
German female alpine skiers
Living people
People from Traunstein (district)
Sportspeople from Upper Bavaria
21st-century German women